Sir Yellow was a British TV sitcom aired on ITV from 15 July - 19 August 1973. It starred Jimmy Edwards in the title role and also featured Melvyn Hayes, Alan Curtis, and Michael Ripper. The show was set in the 13th century and followed the misadventures of a cowardly, womanising, alcoholic knight. The programme was axed after just one series following bad reviews and was never brought back for a second; in 2003 the TV critic Mark Lewisohn named it "the worst British sitcom of all time" in his book The Radio Times Guide to TV Comedy.

Cast 
 Jimmy Edwards - Sir Yellow
 Melvyn Hayes - Gregory
 Michael Ripper - Cedric
 Alan Curtis - Sir Griswold

Episodes 
 A Knight To Remember - 15 July 1973
 Getting Ye Treatment - 22 July 1973
 Ye Turn Of Ye Worm   - 29 July 1973
 Love All - 5 August 1973
 I'll Tag Along With Thee - 12 August 1973
 That's Ye Spirit - 19 August 1973

References

The Radio Times Guide to TV Comedy, Mark Lewisohn, BBC Worldwide 2003

External links

ITV sitcoms
1973 British television series debuts
1973 British television series endings
1970s British sitcoms
Television series by ITV Studios
Television series by Yorkshire Television
English-language television shows